Geoffrey Bonny Namwandu (born 31 August 1979) is a retired Tanzanian football midfielder.

References

1979 births
Living people
Tanzanian footballers
Tanzania international footballers
Prisons F.C. players
Young Africans S.C. players
Saraswoti Youth Club players
Lipuli F.C. players
Association football midfielders
Tanzanian expatriate footballers
Expatriate footballers in Nepal
Tanzanian expatriate sportspeople in Nepal
Tanzanian Premier League players